Arthur Shaw (9 April 1924 – 2 November 2015) was an English professional footballer who played as a wing half in the Football League for Brentford, Arsenal and Watford.

Career
Born in Limehouse, Shaw made a total of 64 appearances in the Football League for Brentford, Arsenal and Watford. He also played non-League football for Southall, Hayes and Gravesend & Northfleet. Shaw made 25 league appearances during Arsenal's 1952–53 First Division championship-winning season. A flag bearing his name flies in tribute on the Ken Friar Bridge, close to Arsenal tube station.

Career statistics

Honours 
Arsenal
Football League First Division: 1952–53

References

1924 births
2015 deaths
English footballers
Southall F.C. players
Hayes F.C. players
Brentford F.C. players
Arsenal F.C. players
Watford F.C. players
Ebbsfleet United F.C. players
English Football League players
English expatriates in the United States
People from Limehouse
Footballers from the London Borough of Tower Hamlets
Queens Park Rangers F.C. wartime guest players
Hounslow F.C. players
Association football wing halves